Jeune Etoile de Tana Kintana, known as JET Kintana is a Malagasy football club from Antananarivo, Tana being shorthand for Antananarivo.

It was founded in January 2021 as a merger between top-flight team AS JET Mada and Kintana FC. French manager Nicolas Santucci was lured out of retirement and hired as manager.

References

Football clubs in Madagascar
Antananarivo
Association football clubs established in 2021
2021 establishments in Madagascar